Wayne Junction station is a SEPTA Regional Rail junction station located at 4481 Wayne Avenue, extending along Windrim Avenue to Germantown Avenue. The station is located in the Nicetown neighborhood of Philadelphia. Wayne Junction serves as a multi-modal transfer point between six of SEPTA's regional rail lines as well as three major transit routes – the Route 75 Trackless Trolley and the Route 23 and 53 bus lines. The station served more than 321,000 riders annually in 2018.

Service

The Chestnut Hill East Line joins the SEPTA Main Line at Wayne Junction.  Wayne Junction is the last station before the Fox Chase Line splits off the SEPTA Main Line, at Newtown Junction. Additionally, Wayne Junction is served by the Warminster Line, West Trenton Line, and Lansdale/Doylestown Line on the SEPTA Main Line.

Station

The original station building was designed by architect Frank Furness and constructed in 1881. The current station building was designed in 1900 by architects Wilson Brothers & Company. An old post card once boasted that "more trains stop here than at any other station in the world." 

The station, located in fare zone one, does have a sales office but lacks any dedicated parking spaces. Wayne Junction recently underwent a $11,165,600 renovation that included a new low level railway platform, an additional high-level platform in the inbound side, two new elevators, and new canopies and windscreens.

In FY 2013, Wayne Junction station had a weekday average of 527 boardings and 521 alightings.

The SEPTA's Roberts Yard and Midvale District Bus Garage are nearby to this station.

History

It served a very busy and prosperous business and residential area, drawing from North Philadelphia, Nicetown, Tioga, Logan, Germantown and other points. In addition to the extensive commuter network, service was provided by the Reading Railroad on a regular basis to New York via the Jersey Central and to Bethlehem and beyond on the Lehigh Valley Railroad to Upstate New York and Toronto. Beginning in the 1890s, Baltimore and Ohio Railroad passenger trains between Washington and New York City, including its famed Royal Blue, also stopped at Wayne Junction, using Reading and Jersey Central rails north of Philadelphia. The station was useful for transfers between Reading trains and B&O trains. This was more advantageous than changing between the Reading Terminal and the B&O's 24th & Chestnut Station as those Philadelphia stations were several blocks apart.

Until the B&O discontinued passenger service on the line in April, 1958, it provided regular service to Washington with through sleepers to the West, including Chicago, St. Louis, and Los Angeles on such trains as the Capitol Limited and National Limited. Reading Railroad long distance trains included the Interstate Express and the Scranton Flyer.  The station provided a baggage room and lunch room, as well as the usual telegraph office. On October 25, 1959, Wayne Junction was the starting point for the first of the Reading's Iron Horse Rambles excursions featuring their T-1 class steam locomotives. The surrounding neighborhood was a busy shopping area and provided additional services.

The station has been a contributing property in the Colonial Germantown Historic District since 1966, and the Wayne Junction Historic District since 2012.

Redevelopment
In September 2017, developer Ken Weinstein outlined a $12 million proposal to redevelop properties in the immediate vicinity of the Station including 32 apartment units at the Max Levy Autograph Co. building, a pocket park on a vacant lot across the street, a 1950s diner, an office building, an artisanal manufacturing site, and a barbecue and brewery. Most of the development is taking place in a restored factory and warehouse structures, making use of the federal Historic Tax Credit program.

In July 2018, the Pennsylvania state Historic Preservation Review Board approved the Philadelphia Historical Commission's request to create the Wayne Junction National Historical District, a collection of eight large-scale industrial buildings built between the late-19th and mid-20th century surrounding the Station. The eight properties include the Train Station at 4481 Wayne Avenue, New Glen Echo Mills at 130 W Berkley Street, Brown Instrument Company at 4433 Wayne Avenue, the Max Levy Autograph at 212-220 Roberts Avenue, Arguto Oilless Bearing Company at 149 W Berkley Street, Blaisdell Paper Pencil Company at 137-45 Berkley Street, The Keystone Dry Plate & Film Works / Moore Push Pin building at 113-29 Berkley Street, and 200-10 Roberts Avenue.

See also
Baltimore & Ohio Railroad station (Philadelphia)
North Philadelphia station
Reading Terminal

References

External links

SEPTA - Wayne Junction and Gateway to Germantown: Wayne Junction Construction Project
Newer and Older Photos of Wayne Junction
 Wayne Avenue entrance from Google Maps Street View
 Windrim Avenue entrance from Google Maps Street View
 Germantown Avenue entrance from Google Maps Street View

SEPTA Regional Rail stations
Former Reading Company stations
Former Baltimore and Ohio Railroad stations
Railway stations in the United States opened in 1881
1881 establishments in Pennsylvania
Historic district contributing properties in Philadelphia
Nicetown-Tioga, Philadelphia
Historic district contributing properties in Pennsylvania
Railway stations on the National Register of Historic Places in Philadelphia
Stations on the SEPTA Main Line